The Mount Kupe bushshrike (Chlorophoneus kupeensis) is a species of bird in the family Malaconotidae. It was previously thought to be endemic to Cameroon, where it is found in the Bakossi Forest Reserve and in particular on Mount Kupe. In 2011 it was reported to be present in two sites in south east Nigeria.

Distribution
Its natural habitat is subtropical or tropical moist montane forests. It is threatened by habitat loss.

References

 BirdLife International 2018.  [BirdLife International. 2018. Chlorophoneus kupeensis. The IUCN Red List of Threatened Species 2018: e.T22707678A131946198. https://dx.doi.org/10.2305/IUCN.UK.2018-2.RLTS.T22707678A131946198.en. Downloaded on 7 December 2018.]

Mount Kupe bushshrike
Endemic birds of Cameroon
Mount Kupe bushshrike
Taxonomy articles created by Polbot
Fauna of the Cameroonian Highlands forests